Pseudophlegethontia is an extinct genus of aïstopod stegocephalians. It is the only member of the family Pseudophlegethontiidae. The only species is the type species P. turnbullorum, named in 2003. Fossils of Pseudophlegethontia have been found from the Mazon Creek fossil beds in Grundy County, Illinois, a conservation lagerstätte well known for the exceptional preservation of middle Pennsylvanian taxa.

Pseudophlegethontia has been considered to be morphologically intermediate between derived phlegethontiids and more basal "ophiderpetontids" such as Ophiderpeton. It possesses basal characters such as a relatively short body, "k shaped" ribs, and distinctive skull roof bones while also possessing several more derived features such as a pointed snout, thin gastralia, and a lack of dorsal osteoderms. It is usually, but not unanimously, placed as the sister taxon to phlegethontiids, represented by Phlegethontia.

References

Aistopods
Carboniferous amphibians of North America
Carboniferous amphibians